Shamil Kamilyevich Alimagomayev (born 13 July 1989) is a former Russian football midfielder.

Club career
He made his debut for the senior squad of FC Anzhi Makhachkala on 1 July 2009 in the Russian Cup game against FC Alania Vladikavkaz.

He made his debut in the Russian Second Division for FC Mashuk-KMV Pyatigorsk on 17 April 2011 in a game against FC Energiya Volzhsky.

References

External links
 

1989 births
Living people
Russian footballers
Association football midfielders
FC Rubin Kazan players
FC Anzhi Makhachkala players
FC Dynamo Stavropol players
FC Mashuk-KMV Pyatigorsk players
Sportspeople from Makhachkala